The Rush–Bagot Treaty or Rush–Bagot Disarmament was a treaty between the United States and Great Britain limiting naval armaments on the Great Lakes and Lake Champlain, following the War of 1812. It was ratified by the United States Senate on April 16, 1818, and was confirmed by Canada, following Confederation in 1867.

The treaty provided for a large demilitarization of lakes along the international boundary, where many British naval arrangements and forts remained. The treaty stipulated that the United States and British North America could each maintain one military vessel (no more than 100 tons burden) as well as one cannon (no more than eighteen pounds) on Lake Ontario and Lake Champlain. The remaining Great Lakes permitted the United States and British North America to keep two military vessels "of like burden" on the waters armed with "like force". The treaty, and the separate Treaty of 1818, laid the basis for a demilitarized boundary between the U.S. and British North America.

History

The origins of the Rush–Bagot Treaty can be traced to a correspondence of letters between Acting United States Secretary of State Richard Rush and the British Minister to Washington Sir Charles Bagot, which were exchanged and signed on April 27 and 28, 1817. After the terms of the notes were agreed upon by Rush and Bagot, the Rush–Bagot Agreement was unofficially recognized by both countries. On April 6, 1818, it was submitted to the United States Senate and formally ratified on April 16, 1818. The treaty eventually led to the Treaty of Washington of 1871, which completed disarmament. The United States and Canada agreed in 1946, through an exchange of diplomatic notes, that the stationing of naval vessels for training purposes was permissible provided each government was fully notified in advance.

In 2004, the U.S. Coast Guard decided to arm 11 of its small cutters stationed on Lake Erie and Lake Huron with M240 7.62 mm machine guns. The U.S. decision was based on a climbing number of smuggling operations as well as the increased threat of terrorist activity after the September 11, 2001, attacks. The Canadian government decided that the armament did not violate the treaty, as the guns were to be used for law enforcement rather than military activities. Canada reserved the right to arm its law enforcement vessels with similar weapons.

Military installations

HMCS Stone Frigate, located at the Royal Military College in Kingston, Ontario, was constructed during 1820 to store part of the dismantled British fleet from the War of 1812, which had been dismantled pursuant to the Rush–Bagot Treaty.

There are still military facilities near or next to the Great Lakes:

 Canada
 ASU London Niagara-on-the-Lake Rifle Range at 1848 Lakeshore Avenue, Niagara-on-the-Lake: former rifle training centre, closed 2010 and transferred to Parks Canada, site of landing by American forces during War of 1812 (Battlefield of Newark May 25–27, 1813)
 ASU London,  London, Ontario: Original Wolseley Hall/Barracks closed after 2012 with local Primary Reserve units supported by ASU Toronto are now housed at Captain Neil Logistics Facility
 Canadian Forces College, Toronto: general staff college
 CFB Borden, Borden, Ontario: former training airbase, now Canadian Forces training centre, home to Regular Forces and Primary Reserve units
 CFB Kingston, Kingston, Ontario: HQ to 1 Wing, CF training centre, HMCS Stone Frigate, HMCS Cataraqui Naval Reserve / Royal Canadian Sea Cadets base and home to Regular Forces and Primary Reserve units
 CFB Trenton, Trenton, Ontario: largest airbase in Canada, home to 7 Transport Squadron including VIP transport, home to Regular Forces and Primary Reserve units (8 Wing), Joint Rescue Coordination Centre Trenton staffed with Canadian Coast Guard
 CFD Mountain View, Prince Edward County, Ontario: storage of retired RCAF aircraft and also used as glider school for Royal Canadian Air Cadets units
 Col J. R. Barber Armoury, Georgetown, Ontario: home to Primary Reserve / Royal Canadian Army Cadet and Royal Canadian Air Cadets units
 Dalton Armoury, Toronto: home to Primary Reserve / Royal Canadian Army Cadet units
 Denison Armoury / ASU Toronto, Toronto: former CFB Downsview airbase, 4th Canadian Division HQ, home to Regular Forces and Primary Reserve units; current armoury built in 2003 to replace original from 1961
 Fort York Armoury, Toronto: Primary Reserve / Royal Canadian Army Cadet
 HMCS Prevost Naval Reserve base, Port Stanley, Ontario: home to Royal Canadian Sea Cadets
  Naval Reserve base - Hamilton
  Naval Reserve base, Toronto: home to Royal Canadian Sea Cadets
 LFCATC Meaford, Meaford, Ontario: former tank training range, home to Regular Forces and Primary Reserve units
 Moss Park Armoury, Toronto: home to Primary Reserve units; replaced Toronto Armories demolished 1963 to build Toronto City Hall
 Oakville Armoury, Oakville, Ontario: home to Primary Reserve and Royal Canadian Army Cadets Corps
 Royal Military College, Kingston, Ontario: cadet and staff college
 Winona Rifle Range and Training Centre, Grimsby, Ontario: rifle training center; opened in 1938 and replaced Niagara-on-the-Lake Rifle Range in 2010
 United States
 Camp Perry, Port Clinton, Ohio: Joint training base for Ohio National Guard / Ohio Military Reserve / Ohio Naval Militia
 Duluth Air National Guard Base, Duluth, Minnesota : home to 148th Fighter Wing
 Minneapolis Armory, Minneapolis: former Minnesota National Guard facility now closed and sold 1989
 Camp Ripley, Little Falls, Minnesota: Minnesota National Guard training centre
 Naval Station Great Lakes - North Chicago, Illinois - United States Navy recruit training facility
 Niagara Falls Air Reserve Station, Niagara Falls, New York: home to USAF 914th Air Refueling Wing and 107th Attack Wing of the New York Air National Guard
 Selfridge Air National Guard Base, Harrison Township, Michigan: home to 127th Wing of the Michigan Air National Guard, but also training facilities for Air Force Reserve, Navy Reserve, Marine Corps Reserve, Army Reserve, Army National Guard
 General Mitchell Air National Guard Base at General Mitchell International Airport, Milwaukee: home to 128th Air Refueling Wing of Wisconsin Air National Guard

Outcome
The Canada–United States border was demilitarized, including the Great Lakes and Lake Champlain. The U.S. and the British agreed to joint control over the Oregon Territory.  The Rush–Bagot Agreement laid the foundation for the world's longest east–west boundary—8,891 kilometres (5,525 mi), and the longest demilitarized border in the world.

Although the treaty had caused difficulties during World War I, its terms were not changed. Similar problems occurred before World War II, but Secretary of State Cordell Hull wanted to preserve the agreement because of its historical importance. In 1939 and 1940, Canada and the United States agreed to interpret the treaty so that weapons could be installed in the Great Lakes but could not be operable until the ships left the Lakes. In 1942, the United States, by then having entered the war and allied with Canada, successfully proposed that until the end of the war weapons could be completely installed and tested in the Lakes. After discussions in the Permanent Joint Board on Defense, in 1946, Canada similarly proposed to interpret the agreement as permitting using ships for training purposes if each country notified the other.

Plaques

 
An Ontario Heritage Trust plaque in Kingston, Ontario recognizes the Rush–Bagot Agreement 
(). A plaque also stands at the former site of the British Legation in Washington, D.C. where the agreement was negotiated. A monument stands on the grounds of Old Fort Niagara as well 
(), featuring reliefs of both Rush and Bagot, as well as the words of the treaty.

Notes

Further reading
 Radojewski, Christopher Mark. "The Rush–Bagot Agreement: Canada–US Relations in Transition." American Review of Canadian Studies 47.3 (2017): 280–299.
& Stacey, Charles P. "The Myth of the Unguarded Frontier 1815-1871." American Historical Review 56.1 (1950): 1–18. online

External links

Avalon Project – Text of Agreement
Rush-Bagot Agreement
Nuclear Weapons, the Great Lakes and Lake Champlain HNN article about Rush-Bagot and its impact on the nuclear arms race
Ontario Heritage Trust The Rush-Bagot Agreement, Under the terms of this 1817 arms-limitation agreement, the United States and Great Britain agreed to dismantle most of their armed vessels on the Great Lakes and Lake Champlain and to construct no new warships. The agreement, technically, is still in force.

1817 in the United Kingdom
1817 in the United States
Canada–United States relations
1817 treaties
15th United States Congress
United Kingdom–United States treaties
Treaties of the United Kingdom (1801–1922)
Arms control treaties
1817 in Canada
War of 1812
Canada–United States border
Canada–United States treaties